Juxtapose is the verb form of juxtaposition. Juxtapose may also refer to:

 Juxtapose (album) by Tricky
 Juxtapoz Art & Culture Magazine
 JXTA, an open-source protocol

See also
 Juxtaposition (disambiguation)